This is a list of notable fires in China, part of the series of lists of disasters in China.

This list includes British Hong Kong and Manchukuo.

Structural fire

Entertainment venues
Particularly fires in theatres and night clubs.

Non-entertainment venues
Most fires from 1949 to 1979 were not notable due to lack of records.

Forest fire

Urban conflagration

Over the history of China, three cities stood out to have suffered from repetitive urban conflagrations, including, Jiankang during the Northern and Southern dynasties, Hangzhou during Song dynasty and Chongqing between late Qing and the early republic.

See also
List of disasters in China by death toll
List of fires

References

Lists of fires